Mike Osburn (born April 15, 1968) is an American politician who has served in the Oklahoma House of Representatives from the 81st district since 2016. He is Cherokee.

References

1968 births
21st-century American politicians
21st-century Native American politicians
Cherokee Nation state legislators in Oklahoma
Living people
Republican Party members of the Oklahoma House of Representatives